Malá Lodina is a village and large municipality in Košice-okolie District in the Kosice Region of eastern Slovakia.

History
In historical records, the village was first mentioned in 1386.

Geography
The village lies at an altitude of 265 metres and covers an area of 38.348 km².
It has a population of about 195 people.

External links

Villages and municipalities in Košice-okolie District
Šariš